Judæo-Golpaygani was a language spoken by the  Jewish community living in Golpaygan, in western Isfahan, western Iran.  The first records of Jewish communities in this region date to approximately 750 BC.

Like most Jewish languages, Judæo-Golpaygani was written using Hebrew characters , and contained many Hebrew loanwords. 

Following the decline and consolidation of the Persian Jewish community in the mid-20th century, Judæo-Golpaygani fell into disuse, being replaced by Dzhidi, Judæo-Hamedani, and Persian, among those speakers remaining in Iran, and by English and Hebrew by those emigrating to the United States and Israel.

See also
 Jews in Iran
 Judæo-Persian languages

References
 

Judeo-Persian languages
Iranian Jews
Golpayegan County